American rapper Desiigner has released one mixtape, three EPs, 21 singles (including 13 as a featured artist), 8 music videos (including 4 as a featured performer). 

On December 15, 2015, Desiigner released his commercial debut single, titled "Panda" on SoundCloud, which later reached number one on the US Billboard Hot 100. In 2016, the Brooklyn rapper signed a recording contract with Kanye West's GOOD Music, under the aegis of Def Jam Recordings.

Studio albums

EPs

Mixtapes

Singles

As lead artist

As featured artist

Guest appearances

Music videos

Notes

References

Discographies of American artists
Hip hop discographies